Jérôme Bigard (born 16 February 1985) is a Luxembourger international footballer who plays club football for FC UNA Strassen, as a defender.

References

External links

1985 births
Living people
Association football defenders
Luxembourgian footballers
Luxembourg international footballers
Union Luxembourg players
Racing FC Union Luxembourg players
F91 Dudelange players
FC UNA Strassen players
Luxembourg National Division players